Bungadoo is a rural locality in the Bundaberg Region, Queensland, Australia. The area was formerly known as Albionville. In the  Bungadoo had a population of 315 people.

Geography 
The Burnett River forms the southern and eastern boundary of the locality. The Ned Churchward Weir (originally called the Walla Weir) was built in 1998 across the river between Bungadoo and Promisedland to provide water for irrigation.

The Goondoon railway station is in the north-eastern tip of the locality. It was the junction from the Mount Perry railway line to the Wallaville railway line, both of which are now closed.

History 
In the  Bungadoo had a population of 315 people.

The bin night is Monday.

References 

Bundaberg Region
Localities in Queensland